The 1912 Norwegian Football Cup was the 11th season of the Norwegian annual knockout football tournament. The tournament was open for 1912 local association leagues (kretsserier) champions, and the defending champion, Lyn. Mercantile won their first title, having beaten Fram in the final.

First round

|colspan="3" style="background-color:#97DEFF"|29 September 1912

|}

Semi-finals

|colspan="3" style="background-color:#97DEFF"|30 September 1912

|-
|colspan="3" style="background-color:#97DEFF"|6 October 1912

|}

Final

See also
1912 in Norwegian football

References

Norwegian Football Cup seasons
Norway
Football Cup